The Chair of the Senate of Kazakhstan is the head of the upper house of the Parliament of Kazakhstan who is responsible for opening sessions, preside over regular and extraordinary joint meetings. The post was created on 30 January 1996 at the first newly Senate session opening after the 1995 Kazakhstani constitutional referendum which was held in 30 August 1995 that formed the Senate of Kazakhstan.

List of chairs

See also 

 Chair of the Mazhilis
 Senate of Kazakhstan

References 

Kazakhstan